El-Sayed Fahmi Abaza (1897 – November 1962) was an Egyptian footballer who played as a defender. He competed in the 1920 and 1928 Summer Olympics.

References

1897 births
1962 deaths
Footballers at the 1920 Summer Olympics
Footballers at the 1924 Summer Olympics
Footballers at the 1928 Summer Olympics
Olympic footballers of Egypt
Association football defenders
Association football players not categorized by nationality